Ciliofusospora is a genus of fungi within the class Sordariomycetes. The relationship of this taxon to other taxa within the class is unknown (incertae sedis). Ciliofusospora is monotypic, containing the single species Ciliofusospora oenocarpi. described as new to science in 1963.

References

Monotypic Sordariomycetes genera
Sordariomycetes enigmatic taxa